Ingebretsen   is a  Norwegian patronymic surname which may refer to:

Bjarne Kortgaard Ingebretsen, Norwegian football midfielder
Eugen Ingebretsen (1884–1949),  Norwegian gymnast who competed in the 1906 Summer Olympics, in the 1908 Summer Olympics, and in the 1912 Summer Olympics
Herman Smitt Ingebretsen (1891–1961), Norwegian politician for the Conservative Party
Olaf Ingebretsen (1892–1971),  Norwegian gymnast who competed in the 1912 Summer Olympics
Paul Ingebretsen (1904–1968), Norwegian politician for the Liberal Party
Robert B. Ingebretsen (1948–2003), American engineer and pioneer in the development of digital sound.

Norwegian-language surnames
Patronymic surnames